Ilova River may refer to:

 Ilova River (Bosnia), in central Bosnia, tributary of Vijaka River, which is a left tributary of Ukrina River (near Prnjavor)
 Ilova River (Croatia), in central Croatia, tributary of Lonja
 Ilova, a tributary of the Berzasca in Romania
 Ilova, a tributary of the Timiș in Romania

See also 
 Ilova (disambiguation)